The Parramatta Marist High School is an independent Roman Catholic single-sex secondary day school for boys, located in Westmead, a suburb of the western region of Sydney, New South Wales, Australia.

Founded in 1820 by John Therry, it was the first Catholic school established in Australia, and second oldest school in Australia. Newcastle East Primary School (founded in 1816) is older. Parramatta Marist began under the direction of George Morley. The school was transferred to the site of the present St Patrick's Cathedral in 1837. The school entrusted its operations to the Marist Brothers in 1875, thus becoming Marist Brothers Parramatta (MBP); later, this was changed to 'Parramatta Marist High'. In the 1960s, a decision was made to move the secondary classes to a site in Westmead and leave only the primary classes at the Parramatta site. The Westmead campus was opened in 1966. In 2008, Parramatta Marist High introduced project-based learning into Year 9 which focused on group learning.

History

1820-1875

Therry, an Irish priest, had resolved to emigrate to the penal colony of NSW to serve the religious needs of those being transported to Australia. Once there, he sought to establish a school in Parramatta in 1820 under the direction of emancipist George Morley (possibly 'Marley'), an accountant from County Meath, Ireland, who had been convicted of a petty crime and sent to Australia in 1813. Establishing the school in Hunter Street, Parramatta, in late 1820, the school had, by early 1821, 31 pupils (of both sexes) with 24 Catholics and 7 Protestants. In 1837, a Church was built at Parramatta (later St. Patrick's Cathedral) and the schoolhouse was built adjoining the new place of worship. The school continued to develop over subsequent decades with various lay teachers and pupils of largely Catholic background. Only three years after the arrival of the Marist Brothers in Australia under Brother Ludovic Laboureyas in 1872, the Catholic school at Parramatta came under their tutelage.

1880s - 1960s

The 1880s were significant years for Marist. In 1888, a monastery was built next to the school and in 1889 a headmaster, a Frenchman by the name of Brother Claudius, took over the school. During this time enrolments increased to over 250, the first senior classes were presented for public examinations, facilities were expanded, extra classes were organised at night and on weekends, and competitive sports were promoted with next-door neighbours The King's School being the chief opponents in cricket, rugby, and athletics. The school began to grow. Further development in the new century saw the original stone building demolished (1918) and replaced with the building that housed the junior school until 1994. During the 1920s, and 1930s numbers continued to grow, placing more pressure on classroom accommodation. The 1940s, and 1950s saw the growth and consolidation of the secondary school. Despite the erection of a new wing in 1956, the school in the early 1960s was at breaking point. Enrolment was over 1000, with classes having to be taught in the Parish Hall, which had been sub-divided, on verandas, at St Vincent Boy's Home, and even under an oak tree in the school grounds. The decision was taken to move the secondary classes to Westmead and leave only the primary classes at the Parramatta site.

1966 - 2007

In 1966 the first stage of the buildings on the Westmead campus was opened, and most classes transferred. Further buildings were completed: the Monastery in 1968, the Swimming Pool in 1968, the Library in 1971, the Senior Block in 1973, and Arts and Techniques Centre in 1982, the Administration Block in 1984. Meanwhile, the fields and grounds were developed. In 1993, the Morley Centre was opened as a new multi-purpose facility to accommodate the needs of the school. In 1994, Parramatta Marist Junior, based at the original school site beside St. Patrick's Cathedral, was closed following a Diocesan decision to retain Year 5 and 6 boys at local Catholic primary schools. The old junior school buildings were demolished to make way for the new wing to the refurbished St. Patrick's Cathedral following its devastation by fire in 1996. At Westmead, a Science Building (with 5 laboratories) was opened in 2001. In 2003, after various fundraising events the library (originally constructed in 1872 to commemorate the centenary of the arrival of the Brothers in Australia) was refurbished and named the Br Ludovic Learning Centre; a Canteen was built on the old uniform shop site in 2004; an eLearning Centre was created on the lower floor of the Harroway Building; in 2007 the Science laboratories, TAS, and Creative Arts areas were updated and a 172-seat theatre was built on the site of the old canteen.

2008 - present

In 2008, the school introduced Project Based Learning into Year 9 in an attempt to increase student engagement and emphasise soft-skill acquisition (e.g. teamwork, communication, presentation), with some notable success. Classrooms were redesigned to cater for this technology-rich environment with each student having access to individual computers or personal devices.  Project-Based Learning continues to be delivered to Year 9 and 10 students and has been subsequently rolled back into Years 7 and 8 in the past few years. Parramatta Marist is also a member of the NewTech network which is an American-based Project Based Learning group consisting of over 100 schools in the USA. In 2010, Problem Based learning, the originator of many current constructivist pedagogies (including Project Based Learning) was introduced to deliver courses to the original 'PBL' students moving into Year 11. The approach taken became known as '151' (based on the hourly structure of the course delivery) and has its roots based in the 'One day, One problem' approach to learning pioneered by Republic Polytechnic, Singapore - with whom the school has subsequently formed close ties.  To facilitate the building of new classrooms and admin block, Year 11 students initially undertook '151' lessons in the 'Champagnat Centre', a building leased from UWS (located on land originally owned by the Brothers). This building was vacated in late 2014 following the completion of the aforementioned development on the school site and was later demolished.

In 2013, Year 12 Students first undertook the 'Flipped Classroom' approach which focuses on content delivery through various media accessible through iPads prior to the class, which in turn, allows class time to be devoted to the application of content, addressing issues that arise from previously delivered information and the practicing of responses to HSC style questions. To facilitate the introduction of this approach, the timetable was adapted to consist of three 100-minute lessons per day. In 2016, a hybrid 'Flipped PBL' approach was introduced into Year 11 to address some shortcomings of the 151 program. This change has proven successful with staff and students and is now in its fourth year. That same year, the Cyril Shean Swimming Pool was decommissioned due to many structural failures after nearly a half century in operation. All the swimming carnivals that were previously held at the School Pool have been moved to the John Devitt pool Granville swim centre (named after Parramatta Marist's old boy olympian). In July 2014, a new multimillion-dollar Administration and Classroom block was opened (named the Champagnat Building) and despite being designed initially for other purposes by school authorities, was redesigned by the school to accommodate their PBL approach to learning. In Term 2, 2017, the Principal of Parramatta Marist High, Brother Patrick Howlett, announced his retirement after 15 years at the school. An Acting Principal, Matthew Brennan, was appointed for the remainder of 2017. In 2018, Mark Pauschmann commenced as principal of Parramatta Marist.

Old Boys Union (Alumni Association)

The Parramatta Marist Old Boys Union was founded in April 1926, after 325 old boys of the school gathered for a ‘smoko concert’. The reunion was so successful that they resolved to form a committee for social purposes and support the progress of the School. Almost £100 was raised on that evening for the proposed science room in the school. The first Old Boys Union President was Andrew Creagh. The Union continues to this day and holds an Annual Reunion Dinner in October and all funds raised go towards the Br Coman Sykes Memorial Scholarship (awarded on an annual basis) and the archiving, preservation, framing and display of memorabilia within the school. In 2016, the Old Boys Union established a tax deductible scholarship fund to greater fulfill its aims as an alumni organisation.

Notable alumni

 Daniel Anderson, former coach of the Parramatta Eels and St. Helens and current NRL referees boss
 Peter Arcadipane, automotive designer who designed the Mad Max Pursuit Special
 Kwabena Appiah-Kubi, A-League footballer, representing Incheon United FC
 Major General David Valentine Blake, (1887–1965), Australian military officer commanding the unit who shot down and subsequently buried the Red Baron (WW1); and, the most senior officer present at Darwin in 1942 when the Japanese first bombed the city
 Geoff Brown, Australian Davis Cup tennis player and Wimbledon finalist in singles, doubles, and mixed doubles
 Fred Cahill MBE, politician and Member for Young in the NSW state Parliament (1941-1959)
 Jason Cayless, former professional rugby league footballer and NZ representative rugby league player. He is the younger brother of Nathan Cayless
 Nathan Cayless, Australian Schoolboys, Parramatta Eels and NZ representative rugby league player.
 Cardinal Edward Clancy, Roman Catholic Archbishop of Sydney (1983-2001)
 Sir John Clancy KBE, CMG (1895-1970), Australian judge and Chancellor of the University of New South Wales (1960–70)
 John Devitt, dual Olympic Gold Medallist swimmer
 Jack Ferguson, politician and former Deputy Premier of NSW (1976-1984). Father of federal politicians Laurie Ferguson and Martin Ferguson
 Denis Fitzgerald AM, Australian representative rugby league player and former CEO of Parramatta Eels
 Pat Flaherty, Politician and Member for Granville in the NSW state Parliament (1962-1984)
 George Thomas Ford, politician, and Member of the NSW Legislative Council (1964–66)
 Luke Ford, Hollywood actor
 Paul Gallen, Australian representative rugby league player
 Professor Michael Gracey AO, world-renowned paediatrician, expert in Indigenous health and former head of the International Paediatric Association (IPA)
 Paul Hogan, Australian actor and comedian
 Daniel Irvine, former NRL Rugby League player
 Mick Keelty APM, former Commissioner of the Australian Federal Police
 Jamie Lyon, Rugby league player and former NSW and Australian representative
 Paul Lynch, sprint canoeist and Olympian
 Bernie McGann, (1937 – 2013), Australian jazz alto saxophonist
 Jeff McMullen, Australian journalist, author and humanitarian
 Dan Mahoney, Politician and Member for Parramatta in the NSW state Parliament (1959-1976)
 Michael "Mick" Martin, ex-Wallaby and current Sydney to Hobart Yacht Race owner/skipper
 John Muggleton, Rugby League player for Parramatta, Balmain, NSW and Australia. Former defence coach of the Australian Rugby Union Team, the Wallabies; the ACT Brumbies and Melbourne Rebels
 Josan Nimes, Philippine Basketball Association PBA Shooting guard, representing Rain or Shine Elasto Painters
 Professor Chris O'Brien AO, (3 January 1952 – 4 June 2009), Australian oncologist and surgeon
 Chad Robinson, former professional rugby league footballer
 Darren Stewart, former National Rugby League (NRL) player Penrith & South Sydney
 John Stephens, professional baseballer and Olympic Silver Medallist
 Brian Tamberlin QC, Justice of the Federal Court of Australia (1994 - 2009). Prominent barrister, law commentator and alumnus of Harvard Law School
 Tony Ward, actor and TV presenter
 Chris Warren, former professional rugby league footballer, television, radio, and sports commentator (son of Ray Warren)
 Alex Twal, NRL rugby league player, representing Wests Tigers
 Mick Watson, an Australian businessman
 Stan Wickham, Wallaby player and captain
 Terry Wilkins, Musician and composer
 David Williams, Australian representative rugby league player
 John Williams, former National Rugby League (NRL) player
 Andrew Ziolkowski, Politician and Member for Parramatta in the NSW state Parliament (1991-1994)
 John Wilson (rugby league, born 1978), former professional rugby league footballer
 Sef Gonzales, Filipino Australian murderer who murdered members of his own family

See also 

 List of Catholic schools in New South Wales
 Catholic education in Australia

References

External links
Old Boys' Association

Association of Marist Schools of Australia
Educational institutions established in 1820
Catholic secondary schools in Sydney
Roman Catholic Diocese of Parramatta
Boys' schools in New South Wales
1820 establishments in Australia